The 2011 Russian Open Grand Prix was a badminton tournament which took place at the Sport Hall Olympic in Vladivostok, Russia on 28 June to 3 July 2011 and had a total purse of $50,000.

Men's singles

Seeds

 Ville Lång (second round)
 Kestutis Navickas (semifinals)
 Hsu Jen-hao (third round)
 Derek Wong (semifinals)
 Dmytro Zavadsky (third round)
 Ashton Chen (second round)
 Stanislav Pukhov (quarterfinals)
 Michael Lahnsteiner (withdrew)

Finals

Women's singles

Seeds

 Sayaka Sato (semifinals)
 Ai Goto (semifinals)
 Lu Lan (champion)
 Ayane Kurihara (quarterfinals)
 Anastasia Prokopenko (second round)
 Susan Egelstaff (withdrew)
 Jeanine Cicognini (quarterfinals)
 Tatjana Bibik (first round)

Finals

Men's doubles

Seeds

  Naoki Kawamae / Shoji Sato (champion)
  Hiroyuki Endo / Kenichi Hayakawa (final)
  Vladimir Ivanov / Ivan Sozonov (semifinals)
  Vitalij Durkin / Alexandr Nikolaenko (semifinals)

Finals

Women's doubles

Seeds

  Valeria Sorokina / Nina Vislova (champion)
  Misaki Matsutomo / Ayaka Takahashi (final)

Finals

Mixed doubles

Seeds

  Shintaro Ikeda / Reiko Shiota (final)
  Alexandr Nikolaenko / Valeria Sorokina (champion)
  Anthony Dumartheray / Sabrina Jaquet (second round)
  Vitalij Durkin / Nina Vislova (second round)

Finals

References

External links
 Tournament Link

Russian Open (badminton)
Russian Open Grand Prix